The National Front (abbrev: BN) is a political coalition of Malaysia that was founded in 1973 as a coalition of centre-right and right-wing political parties. It is also the third largest political coalition with 30 seats in the Dewan Rakyat after  coalition Pakatan Harapan with 82 seats and the coalition Perikatan Nasional with 73 seats.

The Barisan Nasional coalition employs the same inter-communal governing model of its predecessor the Alliance Party but on a wider scale, with up to 14 communal political parties involved in the coalition at one point. It dominated Malaysian politics for over thirty years after it was founded, but since 2008 has faced stronger challenges from opposition parties, notably the Pakatan Rakyat and later the Pakatan Harapan (PH) alliances. Taken together with its predecessor Alliance, it had a combined period of rule of almost 61 years from 1957 to 2018, and was considered the longest ruling coalition party in the democratic world.

The Barisan Nasional coalition lost its hold of the parliament to PH for the first time in Malaysian history after the 2018 general election. It was also the first time Barisan Nasional became the opposition coalition, with former prime minister and Barisan Nasional chairman Mahathir Mohamad becoming PH's leader. In the aftermath of the 2020 Malaysian political crisis, together with four other parties, the Barisan Nasional coalition returned to power under a Perikatan Nasional-led government. However, it suffered its worst result in the 2022 election, falling to third behind Pakatan Harapan and Perikatan Nasional, but it stayed in government by supporting Pakatan Harapan.

History

Formation 
Barisan Nasional is the direct successor to the three-party Alliance coalition formed by United Malays National Organisation, Malaysian Chinese Association, and Malaysian Indian Congress. It was founded in the aftermath of the 1969 general election and the 13 May riots. The Alliance Party lost ground in the 1969 election to the opposition parties, in particular the two newly formed parties, Democratic Action Party and Gerakan, as well as Pan-Malaysian Islamic Party. Although the Alliance won a majority of seats, it gained less than half the popular vote, and the resulting tension between different communities led to the May 13 riots and the declaration of a state of emergency. After the Malaysian Parliament reconvened in 1971, negotiations to form a new alliance began with parties such as Gerakan and People's Progressive Party, both of which joined the Alliance in 1972, quickly followed by Pan-Malaysian Islamic Party (PAS).

In 1973, the Alliance Party was replaced by Barisan Nasional. The Barisan Nasional, which included regional parties from Sabah and Sarawak (Sabah Alliance Party, Sarawak United Peoples' Party, Parti Pesaka Bumiputera Bersatu), registered in June 1974 as a coalition of nine parties. It contested the 1974 general election as a grand coalition under the leadership of the prime minister Tun Abdul Razak, which it won with considerable success.

1977–2007 

In 1977, PAS was expelled from Barisan Nasional following a revolt by PAS within the Kelantan state legislature against a chief minister appointed by the federal government. Barisan Nasional nevertheless won the 1978 general election convincingly, and it continued to dominate Malaysian politics in the 1980s and 1990s despite some losses in state elections, such as the loss of Kelantan to PAS, and Sabah to United Sabah Party which later joined Barisan Nasional.

By 2003, Barisan Nasional had grown to a coalition formed of more than a dozen communal parties. It performed particularly well in the 2004 general election, winning 198 out of 219 seats.

Although Barisan Nasional never achieved more than 67% of the popular vote in elections from 1974 to 2008, it maintained the consecutive two-thirds majority of seats in this period in the Dewan Rakyat until the 2008 election, benefitting from Malaysia's first-past-the-post voting system.

2008–2018 
In the 2008 general election, Barisan Nasional lost more than one-third of the parliamentary seats to Pakatan Rakyat, a loose alliance of opposition parties. This marked Barisan's first failure to secure a two-thirds supermajority in Parliament since 1969. Five state governments, namely Selangor, Kelantan, Penang, Perak and Kedah fell to Pakatan Rakyat. Perak however was later returned via a court ruling following a constitutional crisis.  Since 2008, the coalition has seen its non-Malay component parties greatly diminished in the peninsula.

The losses continued in the 2013 general election, and it recorded its worst election result at the time. BN regained Kedah but lost several more seats in Parliament along with the popular vote to Pakatan. Despite winning only 47% of the popular vote, it managed to gain 60% of the 222 parliamentary seats, thereby retaining control of the parliament.

And finally, during the 2018 general election, Barisan Nasional lost control of the parliament to Pakatan Harapan, winning a total of only 79 parliamentary seats. The crushing defeat ended their 61-year rule of the country, taken together with its predecessor (Alliance), and this paved the way for the first change of government in Malaysian history. The coalition won only 34% of the popular vote amid vote split of Islamic Party. In addition to their failure in regaining the Penang, Selangor and Kelantan state governments, six state governments, namely Johor, Malacca, Negeri Sembilan, Perak, Kedah and Sabah fell to Pakatan Harapan and WARISAN (Sabah). The Terengganu state government also fell but to the Gagasan Sejahtera. Barisan Nasional was only in power in three states; namely Perlis, Pahang and Sarawak.

Many of BN's component parties left the coalition following its humiliating defeat at the 2018 general election, reducing its number to 4 compared to 13 before the election. These parties either aligned themselves with the new Pakatan Harapan federal government, formed a new state-based pact or remained independent. They include three Sabah-based parties (UPKO, PBS and LDP), four Sarawak-based parties (PBB, SUPP, PRS and PDP, which formed a new state-based pact GPS),  (under Kayveas faction) and Gerakan.  experienced a leadership dispute, with Maglin announcing that the party remained within the coalition and Kayveas announcing that the party had left the coalition, resulting in the dissolution of the party on 14 January 2019.

Among the remaining four component parties in Barisan National, UMNO's parliamentary seats have reduced from 54 to 38 since 16 members of parliament left the party, while MCA's parliamentary seat maintains one. MIC's parliamentary seats have reduced from two to one after the Election Court nullified the results of the election for the Cameron Highlands federal constituency due to bribery, but BN regained its seat from a direct member under the 2019 by-election.

As a result of these developments, BN's parliamentary seats have reduced to 41, compared with 79 seats that BN won in the general election.

MCA and MIC made a statement in March 2019 that they want to "move on" and find a new alliance following disputes with the secretary-general, Nazri Abdul Aziz. Mohamad Hasan, the acting BN chairman, chaired a Supreme Council meeting in which all parties showed no consensus on dissolving the coalition.

2019–present 
In January 2019, all Sabah UMNO branches including Sabah BN branches were dissolved and officially closed, leaving only one BN branch open. This brings the total BN seats in Sabah to only 2 seats.

Since 2019, Barisan Nasional recovered some ground and won a number of by-elections, such as the 2019 Cameron Highlands by-election, 2019 Semenyih by-election, 2019 Rantau by-election, and 2019 Tanjung Piai by-election, defeating Pakatan Harapan.

In September 2019, UMNO decided to form a pact with the Pan-Malaysian Islamic Party (PAS) called Muafakat Nasional. Its main purpose is to unite the Malay Muslim communities for electoral purposes.  There was however no formal agreement with the other parties of Barisan Nasional, although there were calls for Barisan Nasional to migrate to Muafakat Nasional.  Barisan Nasional continued to  function as a coalition of four parties comprising UMNO, MCA, MIC and PBRS but aligned themselves with Perikatan Nasional to form a new government in March 2020 after the collapse of the Pakatan Harapan government. Barisan Nasional form a new government on 15 August 2021 with Perikatan Nasional after the collapse of the Perikatan Nasional government.

Barisan Nasional also recovered control of the Johor, Malacca and Perak state governments.

On 20 November 2021, Barisan Nasional won a two-thirds majority of 21 out of 28 seats in the Malacca State Legislative Assembly.

On 12 March 2022, Barisan gained a landslide victory in the 2022 Johor state election, allowing it to form the much more stable Johor state government with a two-thirds majority in the Johor State Legislative Assembly, which is 40 out of 56 seats while defeating Pakatan Harapan with 12 seats, Perikatan Nasional with 3 seats and Malaysian United Democratic Alliance with 1 seat.

2022 election 
In the 2022 election, BN faced the worst result in its history, winning 30 out of 222 seats, compared to 82 and 74 seats for Pakatan Harapan and Perikatan Nasional respectively. Several key figures including Noh Omar, Tengku Razaleigh Hamzah, Mahdzir Khalid, Azeez Rahim, Tengku Zafrul Aziz, and Khairy Jamaluddin, lost to either PN or PH candidates. BN also lost several state elections held in Pahang and Perak and won no seats in Perlis. Ahmad Zahid Hamidi, the party president, was re-elected with a slim majority. The election produced a hung parliament, but BN was elected to support the biggest coalition Pakatan Harapan and was rewarded with cabinet posts in the government.

Organisation 

In 2013, the vast majority of Barisan Nasional's seats were held by its two largest Bumiputera-based political parties—the United Malays National Organisation, and Parti Pesaka Bumiputera Bersatu. For most of its history, both the Malaysian Chinese Association and Malaysian Indian Congress have played major roles in Barisan Nasional, but their representation in Parliament and state legislatures has become much more diminished. Nevertheless, each component party purports to represent – and limit membership – to a certain race: UMNO for the Malays, MCA for the Chinese and so on.  In the view of some scholars:

Although both the Alliance and BN registered themselves as political parties, membership is mostly indirect through one of the constituent parties while direct membership is allowed. The BN defines itself as a "confederation of political parties which subscribe to the objects of the Barisan Nasional". Although in elections, all candidates stand under the BN symbol, and there is a BN manifesto, each individual constituent party also issues its own manifesto, and there is intra-coalition competition for seats prior to nomination day.

Member parties and allied parties

Former member parties 
*denotes defunct parties
 Malaysian People's Movement Party (GERAKAN) (1973-2018)
 Malaysian Islamic Party (PAS) (1973-1978)
 People's Progressive Party (PPP or ) (1973-2018)*
 Sabah Alliance Party (ALLIANCE) (1973-1975)*
 United Sabah National Organisation (USNO) (1973-1975 under Sabah Alliance, 1976-1984, 1986-1993)*
 Sabah Chinese Association (SCA) (1973-1975 under Sabah Alliance)*
 United Bumiputera Heritage Party (PBB) (1973-2018)
 Sarawak United Peoples' Party (SUPP) (1973-2018)
 Sarawak National Party (SNAP) (1976-2004)*
 Sabah People's United Front (BERJAYA) (1976-1986)*
 Pan-Malaysian Islamic Front (BERJASA) (1978-1983)
 Muslim People's Party of Malaysia (HAMIM) (1983-1989)*
 Sarawak Native People's Party (PBDS) (1983-2004)*
 United Sabah Party (PBS) (1986-1990, 2002-2018)
 Liberal Democratic Party (LDP) (1991-2018)
 People's Justice Front (AKAR) (1991-2001)*
 Sabah Progressive Party (SAPP) (1994-2008)
 Sabah Democratic Party (PDS) (1995-1999)*
 United Pasokmomogun Kadazandusun Murut Organisation (UPKO) (1999-2018)
 Sarawak Progressive Democratic Party (SPDP/PDP) (2002-2018)
 Sarawak Peoples' Party (PRS) (2004-2018)

List of party chairmen

Leadership structure 
Barisan Nasional Supreme Council:

 Chairman of Advisor Council:
 Mohd Najib Abdul Razak (UMNO)
 Chairman:
 Ahmad Zahid Hamidi (UMNO)
 Deputy Chairman:
 Mohamad Hasan (UMNO)
 Vice-Chairman:
 Wee Ka Siong (MCA)
 Vigneswaran Sanasee (MIC)
 Arthur Joseph Kurup (PBRS)
 Secretary-General:
 Zambry Abdul Kadir (UMNO)
 Treasurer-General:
 Hishammuddin Hussein (UMNO)
 Women Leader:
 Dr. Noraini Ahmad (UMNO)
 Youth Leader:
 Dr. Asyraf Wajdi Dusuki (UMNO)
 Executive Secretary:
 Ahmad Masrizal Muhammad (UMNO)
 Supreme Council Members:
 Ismail Sabri Yaakob (UMNO)
 Mahdzir Khalid (UMNO)
 Mohamed Khaled Nordin (UMNO)
 Zambry Abdul Kadir (UMNO)
 Mah Hang Soon (MCA)
 Ti Lian Ker (MCA)
 Lim Ban Hong (MCA)
 Yew Teong Look (MCA)
 Saravanan Murugan (MIC)
 Sivarraajh Chandran (MIC)
 Thinalan T. Rajagopalu (MIC)
 Kamalanathan Panchanathan (MIC)
 Richard Mosinal Kastum (PBRS)
 Zainon Hj. Kayum (PBRS)
 Edwin Laimin (PBRS)
 State Chairman:
 Johor: Hasni Mohammad (UMNO)
 Kedah: Jamil Khir Baharom (UMNO)
 Kelantan: Ahmad Jazlan Yaakub (UMNO)
 Malacca: Ab Rauf Yusoh (UMNO)
 Negeri Sembilan: Mohamad Hasan (UMNO)
 Pahang: Wan Rosdy Wan Ismail (UMNO)
 Perak: Saarani Mohammad (UMNO)
 Penang: Musa Sheikh Fadzir (UMNO)
 Perlis: Azlan Man (UMNO)
 Sabah: Bung Moktar Radin (UMNO)
 Selangor: Megat Zulkarnain Omardin (UMNO)
 Terengganu: Ahmad Said (UMNO)
 Federal Territories: Johari Abdul Ghani (UMNO)

Elected representatives

Dewan Negara (Senate)

Senators 

 His Majesty's appointee:
 Mohd Hisamudin Yahaya (UMNO)
 S Vell Peeri (MIC)
 Ti Lian Ker (MCA)
 Arman Azha Abu Hanifah (UMNO)
 Zurainah Musa (UMNO)
 Nelson Renganathan (MIC)
 Ros Suyati Alang (UMNO)
 Zambry Abdul Kadir (UMNO)
 Tengku Zafrul Aziz (UMNO)
 Sivarraajh Chandran (MIC)
 Malacca State Legislative Assembly:
 Mohamad Ali Mohamad (UMNO)
 Koh Nai Kwong (MCA)
 Johor State Legislative Assembly:
 Jefridin Atan (UMNO)
 Lim Pay Hen (MCA)
 Pahang State Legislative Assembly:
 Junahis Abdul Aziz (UMNO)
 Ajiz Sitin (UMNO)
 Perlis State Legislative Assembly:
 Aziz Ariffin (UMNO)
 Seruandi Saad (UMNO)
 Perak State Legislative Assembly:
 Shamsuddin Abdul Ghafar (UMNO)
 Sabah State Legislative Assembly:
 Noraini Idris (UMNO)

Dewan Rakyat (House of Representatives)

Members of Parliament of the 15th Malaysian Parliament 

Barisan Nasional has 30 MPs in the House of Representatives, with 26 MPs (or 92.5%) of them from UMNO.

Dewan Undangan Negeri (State Legislative Assembly)

Malaysian State Assembly Representatives 

Malacca State Legislative Assembly
Johor State Legislative Assembly
Negeri Sembilan State Legislative Assembly
Pahang State Legislative Assembly

Terengganu State Legislative Assembly
Sabah State Legislative Assembly
Perak State Legislative Assembly

Kelantan State Legislative Assembly
Selangor State Legislative Assembly
Kedah State Legislative Assembly

Penang State Legislative Assembly
Perlis State Legislative Assembly
Sarawak State Legislative Assembly

Barisan Nasional state governments

General election results

Ministerial posts

State election results

Notes

References

Literature 
 Chok, Suat Ling (4 October 2005). "MPs in the dock". New Straits Times, p. 1, 6.
 Chin, James. 2002. Malaysia: The Barisan National Supremacy. In David Newman & John Fuh-sheng Hsieh (eds), How Asia Votes, pp. 210–233. New York: Chatham House, Seven Bridges Press. .
 Pillai, M.G.G. (3 November 2005). "National Front parties were not formed to fight for Malaysian independence". Malaysia Not Today

External links 

 

Political party alliances in Malaysia
Political parties established in 1973
1973 establishments in Malaysia
Right-wing politics in Malaysia
Social conservative parties